The 1948–49 season was the 69th season of competitive football by Rangers.

Overview
Rangers played a total of 44 competitive matches during the 1948–49 season becoming the first club to win The Treble.

Rangers won the league by a single point over second placed Dundee, winning 20 of the 30 matches.

The Scottish Cup was won thanks to a 4–1 win over Clyde with goals from Billy Williamson, Jimmy Duncanson and a brace from George Young.

The club won the League Cup with a 2–0 win over Raith Rovers.

Transfers 
16 August 1948:
Billy Arnison to Luton Town.

21 September 1948:
Charlie Watkins to Luton Town.

Results
All results are written with Rangers' score first.

Scottish League Division A

Scottish Cup

League Cup

Appearances

See also
 1948–49 in Scottish football
 1948–49 Scottish Cup
 1948–49 Scottish League Cup

References

Rangers F.C. seasons
Rangers
Scottish football championship-winning seasons